Adam and Eve (Italian: Adamo ed Eva), also known as The Temptation of Adam, Original Sin, and The Fall of Man, may refer to either of two similar works by the Venetian painter Tintoretto: an oil painting in the collection of the Gallerie dell'Accademia in Venice, made around 1550–1553; and a panel in the ceiling of the Upper Hall of the Scuola Grande di San Rocco, made around 1577–1578.

First version 
For the Scuola della Trinità, Tintoretto painted four or five pictures depicting subjects taken from the Book of Genesis, having reference to the creation of the world; of which two are preserved untouched, and now hang on either side of Titian's Assumption in the Academy at Venice. These are The Death of Abel and Adam and Eve, of which William Roscoe Osler writes:

John Ruskin expresses his admiration in terms of enthusiasm:

The second picture, representing Eve in the act of offering the apple to Adam, has been admired for the beauty of the flesh painting.

Second version 

Tintoretto painted another version for the ceiling of the Upper Hall of the Scuola Grande di San Rocco. Ian Holbourn calls the work "sketchy but very strong"; Evelyn March Phillipps describes the painting thus:

See also 
 Fall of man
 Original sin

References

Sources 
 Bensusan, S. L. (1908). Tintoretto. Hare, T. Leman (ed.). Masterpieces in Colour. London: T. C. & E. C. Jack; New York: Frederick A. Stokes Co. pp. 36, 69.
 Holborn, J. B. Stroughton (1907). Jacopo Robusti, Called Tintoretto. Williamson, G. C. (ed.). The Great Masters in Painting and Sculpture. London: George Bell & Sons. pp. 31, 32, 55, 101, 124, 126.
 Krischel, Roland (2000). Meister der italienischen Kunst. Tintoretto (Jacopo Tintoretto, 1519–1594). Translated by Bell, Anthea. Germany: Könemann Verlagsgesellschaft. p. 45.
 Newton, Eric (1972). Tintoretto. Westport, CT: Greenwood Press. pp. 46, 47, 78, 80, 82.
 Osler, W. Roscoe (1892). Tintoretto. Illustrated Biographies of the Great Artists. London: Sampson Low, Marston, Searle, & Rivington. pp. 24, 58, 92.
 Phillipps, Evelyn March (1911). Tintoretto. London: Methuen & Co. Ltd. pp. 44, 45, 76.
 Ruskin, John (1877). Guide to the Principal Pictures in the Academy of Fine Arts at Venice. London and Aylesbury: Hazell, Watson, and Viney. p. 10.
 Stearns, Frank Preston (1894). Life and Genius of Jacopo Robusti, Called Tintoretto. New York and London: G. P. Putnam's Sons. pp. 110, 111, 150, 163, 295.
 "The Temptation of Adam". Gallerie dell'Accademia di Venezia. 2020. Retrieved 5 August 2022.

1550s paintings
Paintings by Tintoretto
Paintings depicting Adam and Eve
1570s paintings